The position of High Sheriff of the Isle of Wight was created in 1974.

Roll of High Sheriffs of the Isle of Wight
1974–75 Lieut.-Colonel Claude Richard Henry Kindersley,  of Hamstead Grange, Yarmouth.
1975–76 Rear-Admiral Joseph Leslie Blackham,  of " Downedge ", The Mall, Brading, Sandown.
1976–77 Forester Richard John Britten,  of St. Denis, High Street, Bembridge 
1977–78 Air Commodore James Michael Birkin, of Little Burneston,Ashlake Copse, Fishbourne.
1978–79 Major-General Sir Robert Anthony Pigot, 7th Baronet, of Yew Tree Lodge, Love Lane,Bembridge
1979–80 Eric Graham Feben, of Pound Cottage, Calbourne, Newport.
1980–81 Michael St George Stephenson Clarke, of Shalcombe Manor, Yarmouth.
1981–82 Denys Felton Peel, of Tyne Hall, Bembridge 
1982–83 William Thomas Cooper  JP, DL, of Fishbourne, Ryde 
1983–84 Major General Oliver McCrea Roome, 
1984–85  D. M. C. Roberts, 
1985–86 V. Gordon Walker, of Stonelands, Binstead 
1986–87 A. J. Sheldon 
1987–88 Henry A. Bowring 
1988–89 R. J. Westmore 
1989–90 Christopher Donald Jack Bland  of Yafford House, Yafford, Shorwell 
1990–91 H. E. C. Noyes 
1991–92 D. F. Campbell
1992–93 David E. J. Guy 
1993–94 David Brian Barrie Cheverton
1994–95 M. G. Ball
1995–96 John James Woodward Attrill 
1996–97  Judi A. Griffin
1997–98 Richard Linthorn Bradbeer 
1998–99 David C. Biles
1999–2000 Samuel Humfrey Gaskell Twining, 
2000–01 Dr Charles A. N. Mobbs
2001–02 Captain Henry N. J. Wrigley
2002–03  Anne P. P. Springman
2003–04  Judith K. Hammer
2004–05 Anthony H. Goddard
2005–06 Lieutenant Colonel J. H. (Danny) Fisher
2006–07 Peter M.G.B. Grimaldi
2007–08 Lieutenant Colonel David E. Langford
2008–09 Alan Titchmarsh
2009–10 Gabrielle Anne Lynam Edwards
2010–11 Peter D. Kingston,  
2011–12  Susan Jean Sheldon 
2012–13 Nicholas W. T. Hayward 
2013–14  Mary L. Case
2014–15  Claire E. B. Locke 
2015–16 Ronald Thomas Holland of Ryde 
2016-17 Robin Vandeleur Courage of Ryde, Isle of Wight
2017-18 Ben M.A.S. Rouse of West Cowes
2018–19  Gioia Maria Minghella-Giddens 
2019–20 Geoffrey Paul Underwood of Carisbrooke, Newport 
2020-21  Caroline Jane Peel of Bembridge
2021-22  James R W Attrill, of Whitwell
2022-23  Kay Ann Marriott of Cowes
2023-24:  Dawn Kirsten Haig-Thomas

References

External links
 High Sheriff of the Isle of Wight official webpage

 
Isle of White
Local government on the Isle of Wight
High Sheriff